Oden is a Japanese food.

Oden may also refer to:

People

Surname 
 Beverly Oden (born 1971), American volleyball player
 Birgitta Odén (1921–2016), Swedish historian
 Curly Oden (1899–1978), American football player
 Elaina Oden (born 1967), American volleyball player
 Greg Oden, (born 1988), American basketball player
 J. Tinsley Oden (born 1936), American academic
 Jeremy Oden (born 1968), American politician
 Johnnie Oden (1902–1972), American Negro league baseball player
 St. Louis Jimmy Oden (1903–1977), American blues musician
 Kim Oden (born 1964), American volleyball player
 Lon Oden (1863–1910), Texas Ranger of the Old West
 Robert A. Oden (born 1946), American academic
 Ron Oden (born 1950), American politician
 Scott Oden (born 1967), American writer
 Songül Öden (born 1979), Turkish actress
 Svante Odén (born 1924, disappeared 1986), Swedish soil scientist, meteorologist, and chemist
 Sven Odén (1887-1934), Swedish chemist and soil scientist
 Thomas C. Oden (1931–2016), American theologian
 William B. Oden (1935–2018), American Methodist bishop

Given name 
 Oden Bowie (1826–1894), American politician, 34th governor of Maryland
 Takahashi Oden (1848–1879), Japanese murderer,  last woman in Japan to be executed by beheading

Places 
 Odèn, Catalonia, Spain, a village
 Oden, Arkansas, United States, a town
 Oden, Michigan, United States, an unincorporated community and census-designated place
 Oden Lake, Scandia, Sweden - see Söderåsen

Other uses 
 Odin, sometimes Oden, a widely revered god in Germanic mythology
 List of ships named Oden
 Oden-class coastal defence ship, a Swedish Navy class
 Oden Institute for Computational Engineering and Sciences, University of Texas at Austin
 Oden High School, Oden, Arkansas

See also 

 Odin (disambiguation)